"Numb" is a song by American singer August Alsina, released on December 10, 2013, as the third single from his debut studio album Testimony (2014). The song was produced by DJ Mustard and features guest appearances from American rappers B.o.B and Yo Gotti. When it was originally released in October 2013 it featured West Coast rappers Iamsu! and Problem. The song has since peaked at number 39 on the US Billboard Hot R&B/Hip-Hop Songs.

Commercial performance 
Following the BET Awards 2014, August Alsina experienced a surge in digital single sales resulting in "Numb" reaching a new peak of 41 on the Billboard Hot R&B/Hip-Hop Songs chart. On the week ending June 29, 2014, the song sold 8,757 copies, up from 3,920 copies the previous week.

Music video 
The music video for "Numb" was released on December 2, 2013.

Chart performance

References 

2013 songs
2013 singles
August Alsina songs
B.o.B songs
Yo Gotti songs
Song recordings produced by Mustard (record producer)
Songs written by Yo Gotti
Songs written by Mustard (record producer)
Songs written by B.o.B